Jont Openheart (born Jonathan Mark Smith Whittington, 17 August 1973) is an English singer-songwriter. First achieving prominence as a slow left-arm spinner for Middlesex County Cricket Club, he then shifted focus to poetry then to music. Mainstream attention followed after his song "Sweetheart" was featured on the soundtrack to the 2005 US comedy film Wedding Crashers and two tracks from his 2008 album Supernatural were featured in season 5 of the US medical drama Grey's Anatomy.

In 2019, Jont released his ninth album, Gentle Warrior, which expressed his deepening orientation towards spirituality and the healing power of music, and started playing "Gentle Warrior Ceremonies", a performance concept fusing song and meditation.

Early life 
Dividing his youth between the United States and England, Jont first started writing poems aged fourteen. While still a teenager, he toured the US conducting interviews with a series of prominent American poets including Allen Ginsberg and Jonathan Williams. Returning to England at age eighteen, Whittington began playing for Middlesex as a slow left-arm spinner and Phil Tufnell's number two. He made a single first-class appearance for the county against Cambridge University at Fenner's in 1992, with Whittington not required to bat in the match, while with the ball he went wicketless. During this period, he attended Manchester University to study English and American literature.

Music career

1998–2010 
Frustrated with the limited reception his poetry was achieving, Whittington started performing as a musician in the groups Your Baby and Funnybone before going solo. After leaving University he moved to London, attaining a residency at the 12 Bar Club which he called Unlit. Over the next five years he would play host to and perform with such artists as Tom Baxter, Polly Paulusma, Solomon (later to become The Duke Spirit), Boo Hewerdine, Archie Bronson Outfit, Adem and Antonio Forcione.

During this time Whittington recorded his first albums, Life Is Fine and 28 on his own label Unlit Records.

In 2003, Whittington moved to New York whereupon he began regularly performing with artists such as Joan As Policewoman and Artanker Convoy. During this period he was taken under the wing of Fleetwood Mac manager Tony Dimitriades in Los Angeles and, after moving to Hollywood, began working with several producers including Tom Rothrock, Bill Laswell and Mushroom from Massive Attack.

In 2005, he released the EP One Long Song which was awarded four stars from Q. The track, "You Can Be The Stars", was given high rotation on Dermot O'Leary's BBC Radio 2 show and Whittington appeared on the show to perform live. His cover of Goldfrapp's "Number 1" was subsequently released on the compilation album The Saturday Sessions: The Dermot O'Leary Show. The song "Sweetheart" from the EP was used during the end credits of the Hollywood comedy Wedding Crashers. In mid 2006, Whittington toured the United States. Following this tour at the invitation of the BBC performed as part of the Electric Proms.

2008 saw the release of the album Supernatural, recorded in Paris and London. In September, the track "Another Door Closes" was featured in the season 5 premiere of the US medical drama Grey's Anatomy and received airplay from Jonathan Ross on BBC Radio 2.

In March 2009, the track "Don't Waste All Your Tears" was featured in Season Seven of CBS primetime show Without a Trace, and the song "Sweetheart" was featured in Season Five of Grey's Anatomy in April.

Jont released his third studio album Set It Free in May 2010 followed by his fourth album Whole Again in November 2010 – the first to be released solely thoroughly through his own webstore.

2013–present 
In 2012, Jont relocated from London to Halifax, Nova Scotia, titling his fifth album Hello Halifax to mark the occasion.

Taking a break to focus on fatherhood, Jont returned in 2017 with An Old Innocence, recording and performing the album live with a full band called The Infinite Possibility. The album was recorded by Howard Bilerman (Arcade Fire)

In 2019, Jont released his seventh album Gentle Warrior, showcasing a quieter singing style that allowed him to sing "from a place inside that felt more connected to my true essence."

Jont will release a follow-up album entitled Thank You for the Medicine in 2020.

Unlit 
In the summer of 2006, Whittington posted a message on his Myspace profile essentially inviting people to offer their homes as venues for his tour of US – a concept simply tagged Unlit. Cameraman Dave Depares joined him to document the tour, and the resulting ten-part video blog series was posted on YouTube entitled The State We're In.

From April to May 2008, Whittington and Depares filmed a second ten-part series of their video blog, this time entitled The House We're In and taking Unlit to Myspace user's houses in the UK.

Shortly after this UK telecoms company Orange commissioned a third series of the show, called The Road We're On, as part of their "I Am Everyone" campaign. Episodes were premiered on Myspace a week before being posted on YouTube. Eight episodes were posted, plus a twenty-minute retrospective documentary, which was posted on Dailymotion.

The Unlit series has been viewed by over two million people.

In October 2008, in conjunction with the BBC Radio 2's Dermot O'Leary show and the BBC's Electric Proms, the Unlit series culminated in an Electric Proms/Unlit event in North London.

"Unlit has developed from an underground movement to a viral phenomenon worldwide" – The Guardian

Gentle Warrior Ceremonies 
A natural evolution from the UNLIT concept, in 2019 Jont started performing Sacred Song Ceremonies in keeping with his newfound direction of tapping into the power of music to heal. Described as "gatherings of song and ceremony where the music serves as a unifying energy for connection, celebration and healing", they are held in conscious spaces such as yoga studios and often feature collaborators who offer meditation, mantras or other forms of healing sound. Ceremony tours have taken place across Eastern Canada and Europe.

Discography

Studio albums 
 Gentle Warrior (Unlit Records) (2019)
 An Old Innocence (Unlit Records) (2017)
 Hello Halifax (Unlit Records) (2012)
 Whole Again (Unlit Records) (2010)
 Set It Free (Unlit Records) (2010)
 Supernatural (Unlit Records) (2008)
 One Long Song (Everybody's Records) (2005)
 Everything You Need To Know About Life in 74 minutes (Private) (2002 Italy, 200 copies made for Italian tour)
 28 (Unlit Records) (2002 Italy, 2008 Rest of World)
 Life Is Fine (1998)

Live albums 
 A Spaceship on the Ocean Floor (Unlit Records) (2019)

Single releases

References

External links 
 
 Official Site
 Official Profile on MySpace
 Unlit Page featuring all three series of the video blog – The State We're In, The House We're In and The Road We're On
 Orange Unlit Tour central website
Jonathan Whittington at ESPNcricinfo
Jonathan Whittington at CricketArchive

1973 births
Living people
People educated at Eton College
People from Marylebone
English cricketers
Middlesex cricketers
English male singer-songwriters
English rock guitarists
British alternative rock musicians
Alternative rock guitarists
English male guitarists
21st-century English singers
21st-century British guitarists
21st-century British male singers